Plectanocotyle is a genus of monogeneans in the family Plectanocotylidae. All its members are parasites on the gills of fish. It includes four species:

 Plectanocotyle elliptica Diesing, 1850
 Plectanocotyle gurnardi (Van Beneden & Hesse, 1863) Llewellyn, 1941
 Plectanocotyle lastovizae Ayadi, Tazerouti, Gey & Justine, 2022
 Plectanocotyle major Boudaya, Neifar & Euzet, 2006

References 

Polyopisthocotylea
Parasites of fish
Monogenea genera